The following is a list of Chinese films released in 2017.

Highest-grossing films
These are the top 10 grossing Chinese films that were released in China in 2017:

Films

January – March

April – June

July – September

October – December

See also
2017 in China
List of 2017 box office number-one films in China

References

2017
Films
Chinese